Tarang Cine Productions is an Indian motion picture production and distribution company based in Bhubaneswar, Odisha, as a part of the Odia film industry. The company was founded by Odisha Television Network in 2015. Others sections of Odisha Television Network are OTV, Odisha Reporter, Tarang, Alankar, Tarang Music, Prarthana. and TarangPlus.

History
Ishq Tu Hi Tu, Tarang Cine Productions first venture was released in January 2015 with powerstar Arindam Roy.

Film production

References

Odisha Television Network
Film distributors of India
Film production companies of Odisha
Companies based in Bhubaneswar
Entertainment companies established in 2015
Indian companies established in 2015
2015 establishments in Odisha